Rossoshki is a rural locality (a selo) and the administrative center of Rossoshkinskoye Rural Settlement, Repyovsky District, Voronezh Oblast, Russia. The population was 540 as of 2010. There are 12 streets.

Geography 
Rossoshki is located 34 km northeast of Repyovka (the district's administrative centre) by road. Buzenki is the nearest rural locality.

References 

Rural localities in Repyovsky District